Riga is the capital and largest city of Latvia and is home to 605,802 inhabitants which is a third of Latvia's population. The city lies on the Gulf of Riga at the mouth of the Daugava river where it meets the Baltic Sea.

Riga was founded in 1201 and is a former Hanseatic League member. Riga's historical centre is a UNESCO World Heritage Site, noted for its Art Nouveau/Jugendstil architecture and 19th century wooden architecture. Riga was the European Capital of Culture in 2014, along with Umeå in Sweden. Riga hosted the 2006 NATO Summit, the Eurovision Song Contest 2003, the 2006 IIHF Men's World Ice Hockey Championships, 2013 World Women's Curling Championship and the 2021 IIHF World Championship. It is home to the European Union's office of European Regulators for Electronic Communications (BEREC). In 2017, it was named the European Region of Gastronomy.

In 2016, Riga received over 1.4 million visitors. The city is served by Riga International Airport, the largest and busiest airport in the Baltic states. Riga is a member of Eurocities, the Union of the Baltic Cities (UBC) and Union of Capitals of the European Union (UCEU).

Etymology 

There are numerous and speculative theories for the origin of the name Riga:

 It is an adapted borrowing from the Livonian ringa meaning loop, referring to the ancient natural harbour formed by the tributary loop of the Daugava River.
 It could be derived from Riege, the German name for the River Rīdzene, a former tributary of the Daugava.
 Bishop Albert claimed credit from his campaign to conquer and convert the local populace, as coming from the Latin rigata ("irrigated"), symbolising an "irrigation of dry pagan souls by Christianity".

However, the most reliably documented explanation is the affirmation by German historian Dionysius Fabricius (1610) that Riga's name comes from its already established role in trade: "Riga nomen sortita est suum ab aedificiis vel horreis quorum a litus Dunae magna fuit copia, quas livones sua lingua Rias vocare soliti."  ("Riga obtained its name from the buildings or warehouses found in great number along the banks of the Duna, which the Livs in their own language are accustomed to call Riae."). The "j" in Latvian rīja hardened to a "g" in German. English geographer Richard Hakluyt (1589) corroborates this account, calling Riga Rie, as pronounced in Latvian.

History

Founding 
The river Daugava has been a trade route since antiquity, part of the Vikings' Dvina–Dnieper navigation route to Byzantium. A sheltered natural harbour  upriver from the mouth of the Daugava—the site of today's Riga—has been recorded, as Duna Urbs, as early as the 2nd century. It was settled by the Livs, a Finnic tribe.

Riga began to develop as a centre of Viking trade during the early Middle Ages.
Riga's inhabitants occupied themselves mainly with fishing, animal husbandry, and trading, later developing crafts (in bone, wood, amber, and iron).

The Livonian Chronicle of Henry testifies to Riga having long been a trading centre by the 12th century, referring to it as portus antiquus (ancient port), and describes dwellings and warehouses used to store mostly flax, and hides. German traders began visiting Riga, establishing a nearby outpost in 1158.

Along with German traders the monk Meinhard of Segeberg arrived to convert the Livonian pagans to Christianity. Catholic and Orthodox Christianity had already arrived in Latvia more than a century earlier, and many Latvians had been baptised. Meinhard settled among the Livs, building a castle and church at Uexküll (now known as Ikšķile), upstream from Riga, and established his bishopric there. The Livs, however, continued to practice paganism and Meinhard died in Uexküll in 1196, having failed in his mission. In 1198, the Bishop Berthold arrived with a contingent of crusaders and commenced a campaign of forced Christianisation. Berthold died soon afterwards and his forces were defeated.

The Church mobilised to avenge this defeat. Pope Innocent III issued a bull declaring a crusade against the Livonians. Bishop Albert was proclaimed Bishop of Livonia by his uncle Hartwig of Uthlede, Prince-Archbishop of Bremen and Hamburg in 1199. Albert landed in Riga in 1200 with 23 ships and 500 Westphalian crusaders. In 1201, he transferred the seat of the Livonian bishopric from Uexküll to Riga, extorting agreement to do this from the elders of Riga by force.

Under Bishop Albert 
The year 1201 also marked the first arrival of German merchants in Novgorod, via the Dvina. To defend territory and trade, Albert established the Order of Livonian Brothers of the Sword in 1202, which was open to nobles and merchants.

The Christianisation of the Livs continued. In 1207, Albert started to fortify the town. Emperor Philip invested Albert with Livonia as a fief and principality of the Holy Roman Empire. To promote a permanent military presence, territorial ownership was divided between the Church and the Order, with the Church taking Riga and two-thirds of all lands conquered and granting the Order a third. Until then, it had been customary for crusaders to serve for a year and then return home.

Albert had ensured Riga's commercial future by obtaining papal bulls which decreed that all German merchants had to carry on their Baltic trade through Riga. In 1211, Riga minted its first coinage, and Albert laid the cornerstone for the Riga Dom. Riga was not yet secure as an alliance of tribes failed to take Riga. In 1212, Albert led a campaign to compel Polotsk to grant German merchants free river passage. Polotsk conceded Kukenois (Koknese) and Jersika to Albert, also ending the Livs' tribute to Polotsk.

Riga's merchant citizenry chafed and sought greater autonomy from the Church. In 1221, they acquired the right to independently self-administer Riga and adopted a city constitution.

That same year Albert was compelled to recognise Danish rule over lands they had conquered in Estonia and Livonia. Albert had sought the aid of King Valdemar of Denmark to protect Riga and Livonian lands against Liv insurrection when reinforcements could not reach Riga. The Danes landed in Livonia, built a fortress at Reval (Tallinn) and set about conquering Estonian and Livonian lands. The Germans attempted, but failed, to assassinate Valdemar. Albert was able to reach an accommodation with them a year later, however, and in 1222 Valdemar returned all Livonian lands and possessions to Albert's control.

Albert's difficulties with Riga's citizenry continued; with papal intervention, a settlement was reached in 1225 whereby they no longer had to pay tax to the Bishop of Riga, and Riga's citizens acquired the right to elect their magistrates and town councillors. In 1226, Albert consecrated the Dom Cathedral, built St. James's Church, (now a cathedral) and founded a parochial school at the Church of St. George.

In 1227, Albert conquered Oesel and the city of Riga concluded a treaty with the Principality of Smolensk giving Polotsk to Riga.

Albert died in January 1229. He failed in his aspiration to be anointed archbishop but the German hegemony he established over the Livonia would last for seven centuries.

Hanseatic League 
In 1282, Riga became a member of the Hanseatic League. The Hansa was instrumental in giving Riga economic and political stability, thus providing the city with a strong foundation which endured the political conflagrations that were to come, down to modern times.

Holy Roman Empire, Polish–Lithuanian Commonwealth, the Swedish and Russian Empires 
As the influence of the Hanseatic League waned, Riga became the object of foreign military, political, religious and economic aspirations. Riga accepted the Reformation in 1522, ending the power of the archbishops. In 1524, iconoclasts targeted a statue of the Virgin Mary in the cathedral to make a statement against religious icons. It was accused of being a witch, and given a trial by water in the Daugava river. The statue floated, so it was denounced as a witch and burnt at Kubsberg. With the demise of the Livonian Order during the Livonian War, Riga for twenty years had the status of a free imperial city of the Holy Roman Empire before it came under the influence of the Polish–Lithuanian Commonwealth by the Treaty of Drohiczyn, which ended the war for Riga in 1581. In 1621, during the Polish–Swedish War (1621–1625), Riga and the outlying fortress of Daugavgrīva came under the rule of Gustavus Adolphus, King of Sweden, who intervened in the Thirty Years' War not only for political and economic gain but also in favour of German Lutheran Protestantism. During the Russo-Swedish War (1656–1658), Riga withstood a siege by Russian forces.

Riga remained one of the largest cities under the Swedish crown until 1710, a period during which the city retained a great deal of autonomous self-government. In July 1701, during the opening phase of the Great Northern War, the Crossing of the Düna took place nearby, resulting in a victory for king Charles XII of Sweden. Between November 1709 and June 1710, however, the Russians under Tsar Peter the Great besieged and captured Riga, which was at the time struck by a plague. Along with the other Livonian towns and gentry, Riga capitulated to Russia, but largely retained their privileges. Riga was made the capital of the Governorate of Riga (later, Livonia). Sweden's northern dominance had ended, and Russia's emergence as the strongest Northern power was formalised through the Treaty of Nystad in 1721. At the beginning of the 20th century Riga was the largest timber export port in the Russian Empire and ranked the 3rd according to the external trade volume.

During these many centuries of war and changes of power in the Baltic, and despite demographic changes, the Baltic Germans in Riga had maintained a dominant position. By 1867, Riga's population was 42.9% German. Riga employed German as its official language of administration until the installation of Russian in 1891 as the official language in the Baltic provinces, as part of the policy of Russification of the non-Russian-speaking territories of the Russian Empire, including Congress Poland, Finland and the Baltics, undertaken by Tsar Alexander III. More and more Latvians started moving to the city during the mid-19th century. The rise of a Latvian bourgeoisie made Riga a centre of the Latvian National Awakening with the founding of the Riga Latvian Association in 1868 and the organisation of the first national song festival in 1873. The nationalist movement of the Neo-Latvians was followed by the socialist New Current during the city's rapid industrialisation, culminating in the 1905 Revolution led by the Latvian Social Democratic Workers' Party.

World War I 
The 20th century brought World War I and the impact of the Russian Revolution of 1917 to Riga. As a result of the battle of Jugla, the German army marched into Riga on 3 September 1917. On 3 March 1918, the Treaty of Brest-Litovsk was signed, giving the Baltic countries to Germany. Because of the armistice with Germany of 11 November 1918, Germany had to renounce that treaty, as did Russia, leaving Latvia and the other Baltic States in a position to claim independence. Latvia, with Riga as its capital city, thus declared its independence on 18 November 1918.
Between World War I and World War II (1918–1940), Riga and Latvia shifted their focus from Russia to the countries of Western Europe. The United Kingdom and Germany replaced Russia as Latvia's major trade partners. The majority of the Baltic Germans were resettled in late 1939, prior to the occupation of Estonia and Latvia by the Soviet Union in June 1940.

World War II 

During World War II, Latvia was occupied by the Soviet Union in June 1940 and then was occupied by Nazi Germany in 1941–1944. On 17 June 1940, the Soviet forces invaded Latvia occupying bridges, post/telephone, telegraph, and broadcasting offices. Three days later, Latvian president Karlis Ulmanis was forced to approve a pro-Soviet government which had taken office. On 14–15 July, rigged elections were held in Latvia and the other Baltic states, The ballots held the following instructions: "Only the list of the Latvian Working People's Bloc must be deposited in the ballot box. The ballot must be deposited without any changes." The alleged voter activity index was 97.6%. Most notably, the complete election results were published in Moscow 12 hours before the election closed. Soviet electoral documents found later substantiated that the results were completely fabricated. The Soviet authorities, having regained control over Riga and Latvia imposed a regime of terror, opening the headquarters of the KGB, massive deportations started. Hundreds of men were arrested, including leaders of the former Latvian government. The most notorious deportation, the June deportation took place on 13 and 14 June 1941, estimated at 15,600 men, women, and children, and including 20% of Latvia's last legal government. Similar deportations were repeated after the end of WWII. The building of the KGB located at 61 Brīvības iela, known as 'the corner house', is now a museum. Stalin's deportations also included thousands of Latvian Jews. (The mass deportation totalled 131,500 across the Baltics.)

During the Nazi occupation, the Jewish community was forced into the Riga Ghetto and a Nazi concentration camp was constructed in Kaiserwald. On 25 October 1941, the Nazis relocated all Jews from Riga and the vicinity to the ghetto. Most of Latvia's Jews (about 24,000) were killed on 30 November and 8 December 1941 in the Rumbula massacre. By the end of the war, the remaining Baltic Germans were expelled to Germany.

The Soviet Red Army re-entered Riga on 13 October 1944. In the following years the massive influx of labourers, administrators, military personnel, and their dependents from Russia and other Soviet republics started. Microdistricts of the large multi-storied housing blocks were built to house immigrant workers.

By the end of the war, Riga's historical centre was heavily damaged from constant bombing. After the war, huge efforts were made to reconstruct and renovate most of the famous buildings that had been part of the skyline of the city before the war. Such buildings were, amongst others, St. Peter's Church which lost its wooden tower after a fire caused by the Wehrmacht (renovated in 1954). Another example is the House of the Blackheads, completely destroyed, its ruins subsequently demolished; a facsimile was constructed in 1995.

In 1989, the percentage of Latvians in Riga had fallen to 36.5%.

21st century 

In 2004, the arrival of low-cost airlines resulted in cheaper flights from other European cities such as London and Berlin, and consequently a substantial increase in numbers of tourists. 

On 21 November 2013, the roof of a supermarket collapsed in Zolitūde, one of the neighbourhoods of the city, possibly as a result of the weight of materials used in the construction of a garden on the roof. Fifty-four people were killed. Latvian President Andris Bērziņš described the disaster as "a large-scale murder of many defenceless people".

Riga was the European Capital of Culture in 2014. During Latvia's Presidency of the Council of the European Union in 2015, the 4th Eastern Partnership Summit took place in Riga.

Geography 

Riga is the second largest city (after Vilnius) in the three Baltic states: Lithuania, Latvia, and Estonia. Riga is home to approximately one tenth of the three Baltic countries' combined population.

Administrative divisions 

Central District
Kurzeme District
Zemgale Suburb
Northern District
Vidzeme Suburb
Latgale Suburb

Riga's administrative divisions consist of six administrative entities: Central, Kurzeme and Northern districts and the Latgale, Vidzeme and Zemgale suburbs. Three entities were established on 1 September 1941, and the other three were established in October 1969. There are no official lower-level administrative units, but the Riga City Council Development Agency is working on a plan, which officially makes Riga consist of 58 neighbourhoods. The current names were confirmed on 28 December 1990.

Climate 
The climate of Riga is humid continental (Köppen Dfb). The coldest months are January and February, when the average temperature is  but temperatures as low as  can be observed almost every year on the coldest days. The proximity of the sea causes frequent autumn rains and fogs. Continuous snow cover may last eighty days.

Government 

The head of the city government in Riga is the mayor, or officially the Chairman of the Riga City Council. He is assisted by one or more Vice Mayors (deputy mayors). The current mayor since October 2020 is Mārtiņš Staķis elected from Movement For!, which is a part of the Development/For!/Progressives faction, but on 24 March 2022, he left the party. The three other parties in the governing coalition each received a Vice Mayor post.

The city council is a democratically elected institution and is the final decision-making authority in the city. The Council consists of 60 members or deputies who are elected every four years. The Presidium of the Riga City Council consists of the Chairman of the Riga City Council and the representatives delegated by the political parties or party blocks elected to the City Council. From February to October 2020, the offices of the Mayor and Vice Mayors were suspended and the council itself had been dissolved and replaced by an interim administration of representatives from three governmental ministries until snap elections were held in 2020.

Demographics 

With 605,800 inhabitants in 2022 as according to the Central Statistical Bureau of Latvia, Riga was the largest city in the Baltic states, though its population has decreased from just over 900,000 in 1991 and the population of Vilnius has just outnumbered that of Riga. Notable causes include emigration and low birth rates. According to the 2022 data, ethnic Latvians made up 47.4% of the population of Riga. Russians formed 35.7%, Belarusians 3.6%, Ukrainians 3.5%, Poles 1.7%, other ethnicities consisted 8.2%. By comparison, 63.0% of Latvia's total population was ethnically Latvian, 24.2% Russian, 3.1% Belarusian, 2.2% Ukrainian, 1.9% Polish, 1.1% are Lithuanian and the rest of other origins.

Upon the restoration of Latvia's independence in 1991, Soviet-era immigrants (and any of their offspring born before 1991) were not automatically granted Latvian citizenship because they had migrated to the territory of Latvia during the years when Latvia was part of the Soviet Union. The proportion of ethnic Latvians in Riga increased from 36.5% in 1989 to 47.4% in 2022. In contrast, the percentage of Russians fell from 47.3% to 35.7% in the same time period. In 2022 citizens of Latvia made up 79.0%, non-citizens 15.3% and citizens of other countries 5.6% of the population of Riga.

Historic population figures

Economy 
Riga is one of the key economic and financial centres of the Baltic states. Roughly half of all the jobs in Latvia are in Riga and the city generates more than 50% of Latvia's GDP as well as around half of Latvia's exports. The biggest exporters are in wood products, IT, food and beverage manufacturing, pharmaceuticals, transport and metallurgy. Riga Port is one of the largest in the Baltics. It handled a record 34 million tons of cargo in 2011 and has potential for future growth with new port developments on Krievu Sala. Tourism is also a large industry in Riga and after a slowdown during the global economic recessions of the late 2000s, grew 22% in 2011 alone.

Riga was intended to become the global financial centre in the former Soviet Union. One bank, which provided high levels of secrecy for its customers, promoted itself as "We are closer than Switzerland!". On 28 July 1995, twenty Latvian banks with assistance of persons from the Paris Stock Exchange organised the Riga Stock Exchange which was the first Latvian stock exchange in Riga.

Culture

Theatres 
 The Latvian National Opera was founded in 1918. The repertoire of the theatre embraces all opera masterpieces. The Latvian National Opera is famous not only for its operas, but for its ballet troupe as well.
 The Latvian National Theatre was founded in 1919. The Latvian National Theatre preserves the traditions of Latvian drama school. It is one of the biggest theatres in Latvia.
 The Mikhail Chekhov Riga Russian Theatre is the oldest professional drama theatre in Latvia, established in 1883. The repertoire of the theatre includes classical plays and experimental performances of Russian and other foreign playwrights.
 The Daile Theatre was opened for the first time in 1920. It is one of the most successful theatres in Latvia and is distinguished by its frequent productions of modern foreign plays.
 Latvian State Puppet Theatre was founded in 1944 and presents shows for children and adults.
 The New Riga Theatre was opened in 1992.

World Choir Games 
Riga hosted the biannual 2014 World Choir Games from 9 to 19 July 2014 which coincided with the city being named European Capital of Culture for 2014. The event, organised by the choral foundation, Interkultur, takes place at various host cities every two years and was originally known as the "Choir Olympics". The event regularly sees over 15,000 choristers in over 300 choirs from over 60 nations compete for gold, silver and bronze medals in over 20 categories. The competition is further divided into a Champions Competition and an Open Competition to allow choirs from all backgrounds to enter. Choral workshops and festivals are also witnessed in the host cities and are usually open to the public.

Architecture 

The radio and TV tower of Riga is the tallest structure in Latvia and the Baltic States, and one of the tallest in the European Union, reaching . Riga centre also has many great examples of Gothic revival architecture, such as the Kalpaka Boulevard Library, and a bevy of Art Nouveau architecture, as well as a medieval old town.

Art Nouveau 

Riga has one of the largest collections of Art Nouveau buildings in the world, with at least 800 buildings. This is due to the fact that at the end of the 19th and beginning of the 20th centuries, when Art Nouveau was at the height of its popularity, Riga experienced an unprecedented financial and demographic boom. In the period from 1857 its population grew from 282,000 (256,200 in Riga itself and another 26,200 inhabitants beyond the city limits in the patrimonial district and military town of Ust-Dvinsk) to 472,100 in 1913. The middle class of Riga used their acquired wealth to build imposing apartment blocks outside the former city walls. Local architects, mostly graduates of Riga Technical University, adopted current European movements and in particular Art Nouveau. Between 1910 and 1913, between 300 and 500 new buildings were built each year in Riga, most of them in Art Nouveau style and most of them outside the old town.

Sports 
Riga has a rich basketball history. In the 1950s, Rīgas ASK became the best club in the Soviet Union and also in Europe, winning the first three editions of the European Cup for Men's Champions Clubs from 1958 to 1960.

In 1960, ASK was not the only team from Riga to take the European crown. TTT Riga clinched their first title in the European Cup for Women's Champion Clubs, turning Riga into the capital city of European basketball because for the first and, to date, only time in the history of European basketball, clubs from the same city were concurrent European men's and women's club champions.

In 2015, Riga was one of the hosts for EuroBasket 2015.

Sports clubs 

 Basketball
 BK VEF Rīga – a professional basketball team that is a three-time Latvian champion. VEF also participates in high-level international competition such as Eurocup
 Barons LMT – a men's basketball team, two-time Latvian champion, as well as the 2008 FIBA EuroCup winner
 TTT Riga – a women's basketball team, which between 1960 and 1982 won eighteen FIBA EuroLeague Women titles
 Ice hockey
 Dinamo Riga – a professional ice hockey club established in 2008. It played in the Kontinental Hockey League until 2022. Dinamo was established as a successor to the former hockey team with the same name, which was founded in 1946 but ceased to exist in 1995.
 HK Riga – a junior hockey club, playing in the Minor Hockey League
 Football
Riga FC – Riga Football Club, commonly referred to as Riga FC, were established in 2015 after a merger of two Riga based teams – FC Caramba Riga and Dinamo Rīga. In 2018 they became champions of the Virslīga Latvian Higher League for the first time.
 RFS – FK Rīgas Futbola Skola, known as RFS are based on the Riga Football School (RFS) academy, established in 1962.
 FS Metta-LU – founded in 2006. Metta play their home games at Daugava Stadium.
 JDFS Alberts – Jura Docenko Futbola Skola Alberts, commonly referred to as JDFS Alberts was founded as a football school in 2008 and subsequently became a professional Latvian football league team.
Riga United FC
FC New Project
Dissolved Football Clubs
 Skonto FC – Skonto FC was a football club established in 1991. The club won fourteen successive Latvian Higher League titles. For a long time it provided the core of the Latvian national football team. Following financial problems, the club was demoted to the Latvian First League in 2016 and went bankrupt in December of that year and subsequently dissolved.
 JFK Olimps – JFK Olimps played in the top division of Latvian football. The club was founded in 2005 and dissolved in 2012. According to a study from January 2011, the club was the youngest team in Europe, with an average age of 19.02 years.

Sports facilities 

 Arena Riga – a multi-purpose arena built in 2006 as the main venue for the 2006 Men's World Ice Hockey Championships. It can hold up to 14,500 people and has hosted ice hockey, basketball and volleyball events, as well as Red Bull X-Fighters
 Skonto Stadium – a football stadium, built in 2000. It is the main stadium used for games of the Latvian national football team and the home stadium of Riga FC. The stadium was previously the home stadium of Skonto FC prior to the team's dissolution.
 Daugava Stadium – a stadium built in 1958, used for both football and athletics
 Latvijas Universitates Stadions
 Biķernieki Complex Sports Base – Latvia's leading motorsport complex

Sports events 

 EuroBasket 1937
 1999 European Athletics Junior Championships
 EuroBasket Women 2009
 2006 Men's World Ice Hockey Championships
 Riga Marathon
 2013 World Women's Curling Championship
 2014 Cricket Latvia play Masstor Cricket Club
 EuroBasket 2015
 2016 Men's World Floorball Championships
 2021 IIHF World Championship
 FIDE Grand Swiss Tournament 2021

Transport 

Riga, with its central geographic position and concentration of population, has always been the infrastructural hub of Latvia. Several national roads begin in Riga, and European route E22 crosses Riga from the east and west, while the Via Baltica crosses Riga from the south and north.

As a city situated by a river, Riga also has several bridges. The oldest-standing bridge is the Railway Bridge, which is also the only railroad-carrying bridge in Riga. The Stone Bridge (Akmens tilts) connects Old Riga and Pārdaugava; the Island Bridge (Salu tilts) connects Maskavas Forštate and Pārdaugava via Zaķusala; and the Shroud Bridge (Vanšu tilts) connects Old Riga and Pārdaugava via Ķīpsala. In 2008, the first stage of the new Southern Bridge (Dienvidu tilts) route across the Daugava was completed, and was opened to traffic on 17 November.

The Southern Bridge was the biggest construction project in the Baltic states in 20 years, and its purpose was to reduce traffic congestion in the city centre. Another major construction project is the planned Riga Northern transport corridor; its first segment detailed project was completed in 2015.

The Freeport of Riga facilitates cargo and passenger traffic by sea. Sea ferries connect Riga Passenger Terminal to Stockholm operated by Tallink.
Riga has one active airport that serves commercial airlines—the Riga International Airport (RIX), built in 1973. Renovation and modernisation of the airport was completed in 2001, coinciding with the 800th anniversary of the city. In 2006, a new terminal extension was opened. Extension of the runway was completed in October 2008, and the airport is now able to accommodate large aircraft such as the Airbus A340, Boeing 747, 757, 767 and 777. Another terminal extension is under construction . The annual number of passengers has grown from 310,000 in 1993 to 4.7 million in 2014, making Riga International Airport the largest in the Baltic States.

Riga was also home to a military air base during the Cold War—Rumbula Air Base.

Public transport in the city is provided by Rīgas Satiksme which operates a large number of trams, buses and trolleybuses on an extensive network of routes across the city. In addition, up until 2012 many private owners operated minibus services, after which the City Council established the unified transport company Rīgas mikroautobusu satiksme, establishing a monopoly over the service.

Riga International Coach Terminal provides domestic and international connections by coach.

As the population of Riga city started to approach 1 million people in the 1980s, the city became eligible (under the Soviet standards of the time) for the construction of a subway system Riga Metro, which would have been paid for by the Soviet government. However, the population decline and shortage of funding following Latvian independence put an end to this plan.

Riga is connected to the rest of Latvia by domestic trains operated by the national carrier Passenger Train, whose headquarters are in Riga. The main railway station is the Riga Central Station. It has stops for public transport along the streets Satekles iela, 13. janvāra iela Marijas iela, and Merķeļa iela. There are also international rail services to Russia and Belarus, and plans to revive passenger rail traffic with Estonia. International overnight service is with Latvia Express trains. A TEN-T project called Rail Baltica envisages building a high-speed railway line via Riga connecting Tallinn to Warsaw using standard gauge, expected to be put into operation in 2024. Latvian Railways ( or LDz) operates the Latvian Rail History Museum in Riga.

Universities 

University of Latvia (LU)
Art Academy of Latvia (LMA)
Riga Technical University (RTU)
Riga Stradiņš University (RSU)
Riga Graduate School of Law (RGSL)
Stockholm School of Economics in Riga (SSE Riga)
BA School of Business and Finance (BA)
Transport and Telecommunication Institute (TTI)
Riga International School of Economics and Business Administration (RISEBA)
Turība University
Riga Aeronautical Institute (RAI)

Notable people

Public service 

Sir Isaiah Berlin (1909–1997), a British social and political theorist, philosopher and historian of ideas
Emil Friedrich von Boetticher (1836–1907) a politician, burgomaster of Riga
Friedrich Heinrich von Boetticher (1826–1902) a German publisher, bookseller, scholar and art historian.
Deniss Čalovskis (born 1985), Latvian computer hacker who created the Gozi virus. 
Valdis Dombrovskis (born 1971), a Latvian politician and EU Commissioner
Laila Freivalds (born 1942), former Swedish Minister for Justice and Deputy Prime Minister of Sweden
Juris Hartmanis (born 1928), a Latvian-American computer scientist, won the 1993 Turing Award
Nicolai Hartmann (1882–1950), a Baltic German philosopher, an important metaphysician
Johann Gottfried Herder (1744–1803), a German philosopher, theologian, poet and literary critic
Albert Woldemar Hollander (1796–1868), a German educator and pedagog.
Yeshayahu Leibowitz (1903–1994), an Israeli public intellectual and polymath
Yosef Mendelevich (born 1947), a Jewish refusenik from the Soviet Union, known as a "Prisoner of Zion" 
Ernst Munzinger (1887–1945), German Abwehr (Army intelligence) officer, later anti-Nazi
Valters Nollendorfs (born 1931), chairman of the board of the Museum of the Occupation of Latvia
Alfred Rosenberg (1892–1946), a Baltic German theorist and ideologue of the Nazi Party 
Johann Steinhauer (1705–1779) a Latvian entrepreneur, social reformer and landowner
Charlotte Wahl (1817–1899), a Latvian-born philanthropist 
Tatiana Warsher (1880–1960), a Russian archaeologist known for her studies of Pompeii

The Arts 

Rutanya Alda (born 1942), a Latvian-American actress
Mikhail Baryshnikov (born 1948), a Russian dancer, choreographer and actor
Léopold Bernhard Bernstamm (1859–1939), a Russian sculptor
Gunnar Birkerts (1925–2017), a Latvian-American architect
Leonīds Breikšs (1908–1942), a Latvian poet, author and newspaper editor
Jacob W. Davis (born Jākobs Jufess) (1831–1908) an American tailor, invented modern jeans.
Mikhail Eisenstein (1867–1920) a Latvian civil engineer and architect
Sergei Eisenstein (1898–1948), a Soviet Russian film director, filmed Battleship Potemkin
Heinz Erhardt (1909–1979), a Baltic German comedian, musician and entertainer
Artur Fonvizin (1883–1973), a Soviet painter of watercolours
Elīna Garanča (born 1976), a Latvian operatic mezzo-soprano
Philippe Halsman (1906–1979), an American portrait photographer
Aivars Kalējs (born 1951), a Latvian composer, organist and pianist
Gidon Kremer (born 1947), a Latvian classical violinist and conductor
Barbara von Krüdener (1764–1824), a Baltic German author, religious mystic and Pietist Lutheran theologian.
Ivan Krylov (1769–1844), a Russian fable writer
DJ Lethal (born 1972), an American music producer, real name Leor Dimant
Alan Melikdjanian (born 1980), a Latvian-American independent filmmaker known as Captain Disillusion
Raimonds Pauls (born 1936), a Latvian composer and piano player
Kristjan Jaak Peterson (1801–1822), an Estonian poet
Valentin Pikul (1928–1990), a Soviet historical novelist
Marie Seebach (1829–1897) a German actress.
Ksenia Solo (born 1987), a Latvian-Canadian actress and activist

Science 

Ernst von Bergmann (1836–1907), a Baltic German surgeon, pioneer of aseptic surgery
Walter von Boetticher (1853–1945) a German historian, genealogist and physician.
Jakob Benjamin Fischer (1731–1793), a Baltic German naturalist and apothecary
Lola Hoffmann (1904–1988), a physiologist, psychiatrist and guide to self-development and transformation
Charles Kalme (1939–2002), an American mathematician and International Master of chess 
Karlis Kaufmanis (1910–2003), astronomer, he lectured that the Star of Bethlehem was a conjunction in 7 BC of the planets Jupiter and Saturn
Mstislav Keldysh (1911–1978), a Soviet mathematician, worked on the first artificial satellite
George Nagobads (born 1921), American physician, recipient of the Paul Loicq Award.
Wilhelm Ostwald (1853–1932), a Baltic German chemist, Nobel Prize in Chemistry in 1909
Georg August Schweinfurth (1836–1925) a Baltic German botanist and ethnologist who explored East Central Africa.
Georg von Tiesenhausen (1914–2018), a Baltic German American rocket scientist.
Juris Upatnieks (born 1936), a Latvian-American physicist and inventor, pioneer in the field of holography.
Friedrich Zander (1887–1933), a Baltic German engineer, designed the first Soviet liquid-fuelled rocket
Walter Zapp (1905–2003), a Baltic German inventor, he created the Minox subminiature camera.

Sport 
Helmuts Balderis (born 1952) a Latvian former ice hockey player
Dāvis Bertāns (born 1992), a Latvian professional basketball player
Jānis Beinarovičs (1907-1967), a Latvian wrestler
Andris Biedriņš (born 1986), a Latvian former basketball player
Sergejs Boldaveško (born 1970), retired ice hockey player, born in Riga
Teddy Blueger (born 1994), ice hockey player for the Pittsburgh Penguins
Tanhum Cohen-Mintz (1939–2014), an Israeli basketball player
Kaspars Dubra (born 1990), a footballer with 50 caps for Latvia
Zemgus Girgensons (born 1994), ice hockey player, highest-ever drafted Latvian in the NHL Entry Draft
Jørgen Hviid (1916–2001), a Danish and Latvian athlete; ice hockey, speed skating and sailing.
Miervaldis Jurševskis (1921–2014), a Latvian-Canadian chess master and a professional artist.
Matīss Kivlenieks (1996–2021), an ice hockey goaltender for the Columbus Blue Jackets
Elvis Merzļikins (born 1994), an ice hockey goaltender for the Columbus Blue Jackets
Anete Muižniece-Brice (born 1962), former basketball player
Jeļena Ostapenko (born 1997) women's tennis player, 2017 French Open – Women's singles winner
Sandis Ozoliņš (born 1972), Latvian ice hockey player, a seven-time NHL All-Star, Stanley Cup champion
Marians Pahars (born 1976), footballer with 75 caps for Latvia
Alexei Shirov (born 1972), Latvian / Spanish chess grandmaster, ranked world No. 2 in 1994
Mikhail Tal (1936–1992), Soviet-Latvian chess grandmaster, 8th. World Chess Champion.
Valdis Valters (born 1957) a retired Latvian basketball player.

Twin towns – sister cities

Riga is twinned with:

 Aalborg, Denmark
 Almaty, Kazakhstan
 Astana, Kazakhstan
 Beijing, China
 Bordeaux, France
 Bremen, Germany
 Cairns, Australia
 Dallas, United States
 Florence, Italy
 Kaunas, Lithuania
 Kyiv, Ukraine
 Kobe, Japan
 Norrköping, Sweden
 Pori, Finland
 Rostock, Germany
 Santiago, Chile
 Stockholm, Sweden
 Suzhou, China
 Taipei, Taiwan
 Slough, England
 Tallinn, Estonia
 Tartu, Estonia
 Tashkent, Uzbekistan
 Tbilisi, Georgia
 Vilnius, Lithuania
 Warsaw, Poland
 Yerevan, Armenia

See also 

Riga Charter, on cultural heritage conservation, adopted here in 2000
Riga Region
Riga Salsa Festival

Other capitals of the Baltic states 
Tallinn
Vilnius

Notes

References

Bibliography

 Grava, Sigurd. "The Urban Heritage of the Soviet Regime The Case of Riga, Latvia". Journal of the American Planning Association 59.1 (1993): 9-30.
 
 Šolks, Guntis, Gita Dejus, and Krists Legzdiņš. "Transformation of Historic Industrial Areas in Riga". Book of Proceedings. (2012) online.

External links 

Riga Municipality portal (in Latvian)

Old maps of Riga in Historic Cities site

 
Cities in Latvia
Capitals in Europe
Populated coastal places in Latvia
Port cities in Latvia
Port cities and towns of the Baltic Sea
Republican cities of Latvia
Gulf of Riga
Kreis Riga
Members of the Hanseatic League
Vidzeme
NUTS 3 statistical regions of the European Union
World Heritage Sites in Latvia
Holocaust locations in Latvia